Benita Eisler (born July 24, 1937, in New York City) is an American writer and educator. She is best known for her biographies of historic figures, including Lord Byron, Georgia O'Keeffe, and George Catlin.

Personal life 
Eisler was born July 24, 1937, in New York City to Morris Aaron and Frances Blitzer. She received a Bachelor of Arts degree from Smith College in 1958 and a Master of Arts degree from Harvard University in 1961. On June 23, 1961, she married Colin Eisler , and together, they have one daughter. 

Eisler presently lives in Manhattan.

She is Jewish.

Career 
From 1975 to 1978, Eisler served as producer to WNET-TV, a public television station in New York City. She has also "worked as an art editor, reporter, on-camera correspondent, and producer of arts programming for [public] television."

Eisler edited The Lowell Offering, which was released in 1977. She published her first book, Class ACT, in 1983.

She has also taught  nineteenth- and twentieth-century literature at Princeton University.

Awards and honors 
Byron: Child of Passion, Fool of Fame received a starred review from Booklist. Naked in the Marketplace received starred reviews from Booklist and Kirkus Reviews, who highlighted the way "Eisler skillfully incorporates much correspondence within a frame of lively writing."

Publications

As author 

 Class ACT: America's Last Dirty Secret (1983)
 Private Lives: Men and Women of the Fifties (1986)
 O'Keeffe and Stieglitz: An American Romance (1991)
 Byron: Child Of Passion, Fool Of Fame (1999)
 Chopin's Funeral (2003)
 Naked in the Marketplace: The Lives of George Sand (2004)
 The Red Man's Bones: George Catlin, Artist and Showman (2013)

As editor 

 The Lowell Offering: Writings by New England Mill Women (1840-1945) (1977)

References 

Smith College alumni
Harvard University alumni
Princeton University faculty
1937 births
20th-century American women writers
20th-century American biographers
21st-century American women writers
21st-century American biographers
Living people